(PanSTARRS) is a comet discovered as a centaur on 28 July 2014 when it was  from the Sun and had an apparent magnitude of 21. The comet was relatively easier to detect at this distance because the nucleus is estimated to be 20 km in diameter.

Clones of the orbit of  estimate a dynamic lifetime (amount of time in the current orbit) of 13 thousand to a million years. 

 will come to opposition on 1 November 2021 in the constellation of Cetus when it will have a solar elongation of 170 degrees. Numerical integration shows the comet last came to perihelion in late July 1979 and will next come to perihelion on 29 November 2021.

References

External links
 C/2014 OG392 ( PanSTARRS ) – Seiichi Yoshida

Chiron-type comets

20211129
20140728